Wilber Parish, New South Walesis a bounded rural locality of Coonamble Shire and a civil parish of Gowen County, New South Wales.

The only town of the parish is Gulargambone.

The Parish is on the banks of the Castlereagh River and the main settlement of the parish is Gulargambone, New South Wales.

References

Localities in New South Wales
Geography of New South Wales